Mellgren is a surname. Notable people with the surname include:

 Dagny Mellgren (born 1978), Norwegian footballer
 Hulda Mellgren (1839–1918), Swedish industrialist
 Linnea Mellgren (born 1989), Swedish figure skater
 Sten Mellgren (1900–1989), Swedish football (soccer) player 

Swedish-language surnames